This is a list of characters from the children's television series Curious George.

Major
 Curious George (or always simply known as George) (vocal effects by Frank Welker) is a tailless monkey who is the titular main protagonist of the show. He is excessively curious and often causes unintentional problems. He is used as the "teachable" character in the show, and he is the one to whom lessons are explained to by the other characters. He is a character that children enjoy watching and can learn from.
 The Man with the Yellow Hat (voiced by Jeff Bennett) is the man who first befriended George and also acts as his primary teacher and mentor. In a 2006 deleted scene, it was revealed that his real name is Ted Shackleford. He does not wear his hat at home, but wears it when going in public. The Man often has bad luck and makes mistakes (such as constantly losing his hat, being in the wrong place at the wrong time, tasting something terrible with a sour reaction, etc.). He is also absent-minded and a bit awkward. His catchphrase when leaving George alone is often "Be a good little monkey." Another catchphrase is "Come on. Can't be late," utilized whenever the Man leaves with George. He never gets angry with George, no matter what George does. It is unclear what his occupation is, but in Curious George and the Invisible Sound he was asked to survey animals around the country house, and in The Fully Automatic Monkey Fun Hat, Dr. Wiseman asked him to give a speech about the scientific method, suggesting that he has the same occupation he held in the 2006 film. He also is the leader of a troop of the Sprouts, to which George and Bill belong. The man makes a couple of references to "going to work;" however, we never discover what this pertains to. He owns a country house that has been in his family since his childhood; and also lives in a spacious, high-income apartment building in the city. The man primarily drives a yellow convertible car as his main transportation to the country; however, he usually walks when staying in the apartment. The Man's hobbies include playing the tuba, bowling, sketching and painting pictures, and long-distance running. He also paints in the style of the H. A. Rey drawings. He won an award for being the first to climb and map what became known as Yellow Hat Mountain and placed seventeenth in a marathon. No mention of his parents is never made, other than an occasional reference to his mother in a few episodes.
 Narrator (voiced by William H. Macy in Season 1 and Rino Romano in Season 2) is the unnamed storyteller who narrates the events of each episode of the show. He mostly talks about the feelings of George and the Man with the Yellow Hat along with their actions.
 Chef Pisghetti (voiced by Jim Cummings) is an Italian chef in the City who owns a restaurant with his wife. George frequently visits him and often helps him by doing errands and chores around the restaurant. The Chef often uses the fresh vegetables he grows in a rooftop garden. His name is a reference to the way some toddlers pronounce the word "spaghetti." Often, when things seem to go wrong, the Chef's catchphrase is "I'm Ruined!" He often threatens to never cook again if there is any problem with his food. He often refers to George as the Italian equivalent "Giorgio" and refers to the Man with the Yellow Hat at least once with an Italian name when speaking to George, calling him "Your friend with the Cappello Giallo Grande, or "Big Yellow Hat". (Incidentally, Google Translate says that "Big Yellow Hat is said as grande cappello giallo.)
 Netti (voiced by Susan Silo) is Chef Pisghetti's wife.
 The Doorman (voiced by Bill Chott in Season 1 and Lex Lang in Season 2) is the doorman for the apartment building in which George and the Man with the Yellow Hat live. He is Hundley's owner. When on duty, he wears red clothes similar to a British Sentry Guard; different only by a red cap. When he went camping with George and Hundley, he wore an outfit somewhat similar to that of a Canadian Mountie. He is friendly and always loves to see George. He keeps a coop of homing pigeons on the roof of the building. Like the Man with the Yellow Hat, the Doorman's name is never mentioned. The doorman has a noticeable Brooklyn accent.
 Professor Wiseman (voiced by Rolonda Watts) is a scientist who is a friend of George and the Man. In different episodes she is seen to be a rocket scientist, and is seen to work at a local museum. Her name is a play on the words wise man. She seems to have an occupation directly related to the man with the yellow hat. She is frequently invited to spend time with the Man with the Yellow Hat and George.
 Steve (voiced by Elizabeth Daily) & Betsy (voiced by Grey DeLisle) are siblings from George's neighborhood in the city. They live with their Aunt Margaret and their dog, Charkie. Steve likes video games and is always "going for a record" of some kind. He is the older child of the duo, and is always obtaining ideas on how to solve a problem. He often tells George, "I'm in fifth grade. This has to work." In the episode Piñata Vision, their Aunt called him by his full name, Steven. Betsy is more responsible and caring, and is often pulling a red wagon. She is frequently annoyed at Steve, and has to fix his mistakes. She is in third grade. Bill is seemingly the country counterpart to Steve and Betsy. They do not appear in the same episode until Season 3, in "Chasing Rainbows." In that episode Bill's ignorance of George being a monkey is elucidated by them. However, he still does not comprehend the fact.
 Mr. Glass (voiced by Rob Paulsen; with the vocal impression of Gilbert Gottfried) is a man who owns a building known as "The Glass Palace" and hires window washers in the city. In his debut episode, he has George clean his windows after he helped Chef Pisghetti dry dishes in his kitchen. Later, George uncovers a catastrophic flaw in a building that Mr. Glass was constructing, though Mr. Glass is still pleased with the building's new angular shape, deciding that it will save money and even rewards George with a new dollar bill. He likes things to be unique ever since George painted a jungle-themed room in The Glass Palace. On a few occasions, he yells at George for doing something he wasn't supposed to do, though he is still pleased with him. Mr. Glass is very wealthy and speaks with a high pitched accent, similar to Gilbert Gottfried.
 Hundley (vocal effects by Bill Chott in Season 1 and Lex Lang in Season 2) is an orange male dachshund. Hundley is very proper and gentlemanly. He keeps vigil on the lobby of George's apartment building when his owner, the Doorman, is absent. George's behavior is not enjoyed by Hundley; despite this, he enjoys George's company. Hundley is very practical minded, and does not shy away from scolding George for reckless antics. Hundley is allergic to some cats, including Professor Wiseman's kitten, Lucky; but not to Chef Pisghetti's cat, Gnocchi.
 Compass (vocal effects by Rob Paulsen) is a blue male homing pigeon, also cared for by the doorman. His sense of direction is substandard, he is therefore often referred to as an "Almost-Homing Pigeon." In the early seasons he is shown mentally attempting to discover what animal George was.
 Jumpy Squirrel (vocal effects by Jim Cummings) is a male squirrel who lives in the country. Although he primarily stays in the trees, he will often end up involved with George. A recurring joke in the series is when Jumpy gets caught in a situation with George and the narrator says "At that moment Jumpy remembered why he always stayed in trees."
 Gnocchi (vocal effects by Debi Derryberry in Season 1 and Dee Bradley Baker in Season 2) is a beige female cat, who is owned by Chef Pisghetti. She is very sedate and contemplative, frequently disregarding the surrounding people.
 Charkie (vocal effects by Rob Paulsen) is a female black cocker spaniel owned by Steve and Betsy. Charkie is very hyperactive, loves doing backflips, and frequently runs away from her caretakers. She is very skilled in opening and unlocking things.
 Bill's Bunnies (vocal effects by Frank Welker) are seven baby bunnies owned by Bill. Their names are Fuzzy, Whitey, Brownie, Spotty, Black Ears, Cotton Tail, and Herbert Nenninger. He also owns their mother (Ma Rabbit), whose burrowing abilities are highlighted in several episodes. In several episodes, most notably "The Perfect Carrot", Fuzzy and Black Ears are omitted from the group, with George expecting only five to be present. Note: In "Curious George's Bunny Hunt", Herbert Nenninger is a brownish-tannish color. In Bee is for Bear, he is white. However, in Curious George's Bunny Hunt, the only white bunny is Whitey.
 Mr. & Mrs. Renkins (voiced by Jeff Bennett and Kath Soucie) are a couple who own a farm near the country house. They have horses, cows, pigs, sheep, chickens, a goat, a sheepdog named Bo; and bees. George also sometimes borrows materials from them, including a water pump and scrap lumber.
 Allie (voiced by Lara Jill Miller) is the 5-year-old granddaughter of the Renkins, who is first introduced in George Meets Allie-Whoops! where she and George become fast friends. Allie is a very perky and spunky little girl who is about George's height and is as adventurous and curious as he. Mrs. Renkins refers to her as a "spark plug". When Allie first meets George, she is excited and eager to learn the ways of a monkey.
 Mr. Zoobel (voiced by Carlos Alazraqui) is George's upstairs neighbor in the city. Mr. Zoobel is a painter in a modern (non-representational) style who sometimes uses stamps shaped like animal feet. He has a de-scented pet skunk named Geoffrey, a gopher snake named Bruno, and two mice named Benjy and Willy. When he first moved in, he used the stamps so much it made a loud stomping noise in George's apartment downstairs making George think he lived with an elephant.
 Marco (voiced by Grey DeLisle) is a Mexican boy who lives in The Puerto Del Sol district, a Mexican neighborhood in the city, he and his family play Spanish music everywhere. He often exclaims "I'm always thinking," referring to the fact that he is always thinking about ways to solve a problem when analyzing a situation.
 Bill (voiced by Annie Mumolo) is George's neighbor from across the street in the country. He owns a hutch of bunnies and has a paper route. He also enjoys flying kites, but seems to be an acrophobic. His catchphrases are, "There's a proper way to ..." and "Why didn't I think of that." Bill has a copious knowledge of many subjects, but apparently does not realize that George is a monkey and often refers to him as a "city kid" to explain the odd things George does. Bill seems to be based on the paperboy from the original books.
 Dinwoodie (voiced by Jess Harnell)
 The Quints (male Quints voiced by Jim Cummings and female Quints voiced by Candi Milo): Mr. Quint is one of George's country friends, Clint Quint is an avid fisherman and one of a set of quintuplets. His siblings include a sister who is a track runner (Sprint, voiced by Annie Mumolo), a brother who is a train-station master (Flint), a brother who is a police officer (Wint), and a sister who prints money (Mint).
 Jagger (vocal effects by Rob Paulsen) is a rooster who's very protective of those hens in the hen yard.
 Hamilton (vocal effects by Rob Paulsen) is a pig.
 Dumpling (vocal effects by Frank Welker) is a duck.
 Dottie (vocal effects by Jeff Bennett) is a deer.

Minor

Animals
 Benjy & Willy (vocal effects by Frank Welker) are Mr. Zoobel's pet mice who are respectively black and white. They feel cooped up in their small terrarium and long for freedom. They are afraid of Zoobel's gopher snake, Bruno because snakes eat mice.
 Bruno (vocal effects by Frank Welker) is Mr. Zoobel's pet gopher snake who only eats once a day. He sheds his skin 3 times a year. Like many snakes, he likes sunshine.
 Doxie (vocal effects by Lex Lang) is another dachshund who was introduced in Season 2. She is almost similar to Hundley in appearance, except that she wears a red collar; however, unlike Hundley, Doxie is bouncy and playful.
 Fluffy (vocal effects by Frank Welker): In the episode "Monkey Fever", Fluffy was a cat who belonged to Betsy's friend and had six kittens. Betsy brought one of the kittens over to George's apartment to show him.
 Geoffrey is Mr. Zoobel's pet skunk. He is descented and domesticated.
 Leslie (vocal effects by Rob Paulsen) is a cow, owned by the Renkins. She's a great friend of George. In the episode "Keep Out Cows!", she and her cows attempt to eat the flowers that George liked. This resulted George attempting to use walls or other property in an attempt to stop them, but failed. However, George built a wall to protect the flowers, resulting Leslie and her cows sparing it.
 Little Mike is a pig owned by the Renkins. He first appears in "Ski Monkey", when he is stranded in the snow. He also appears in "Old McGeorgie had a Farm".
 Lucky (vocal effects by Debi Derryberry) is Professor Wiseman's kitten, introduced in season 2. She likes Hundley, although Hundley is allergic to her.
 Oscar is a white pig owned by the Renkins who won the "prettiest pig" contest in ("Old McGeorgie had a Farm").
 Sue Berm is an elephant who works at the zoo as a painter and is presumably Mr. Zoobel's pet elephant. Every one of her paintings is unique. She signs a painting by marking it with her trunk with green paint when she is done. In the episode she debuts in, Mr. Glass seemingly believes that she's human upon finding out about her by Mr. Zoobell, only to find out she's an elephant herself and not having her own pets. When Charkie accidentally destroys the painting of Sue Berm, George and Sue Berm decide to create a replica of it.
 Tracy (vocal effects by Rob Paulsen in Season 1) and Frank Welker in Season 2) is a hen, owned by the Renkins. She has five (Up the River) or six ("Old McGeorgie had a Farm" and A Bridge to Farm) chicks who follow her around everywhere. The chicks also like George and often follow him around too. The chicks are curious just like George and are often wandering away from Tracy. The youngest of her chicks is named Al.

Humans
 Ada (voiced by Cree Summer) & Luke (voiced by Rob Paulsen) are a couple who own a general store in the country. The store gives a free pickle to anyone who comes and visits.
 Andie, (voiced by Elizabeth Daily) Stig, (voiced by Rob Paulsen in Season 1) and Jim Cummings in Season 2) & Stew (voiced by Kevin Michael Richardson) are firefighter members of Rescue Squad 86 who play in a band with the Man with the Yellow Hat. They are confused as to why they never get "normal" calls having to do with fires and are instead asked to rescue pigeons from whales, dogs from trees, and the like.
 Calhoun (voiced by Jeff Bennett) is a gopher exterminator in the country who is nerdy and has buckteeth, serving as the main antagonist of the episode Monkey Underground. He was hired by Mr. Renkins to eliminate a gopher family that was taking his grapes. However, this disgusts George, not liking the idea of someone catching innocent gophers, so he attempts to build a connecting tunnel for them to escape. Calhoun attempts to feed a gopher grape in an attempt to capture it, though he is trapped in a gopher trap himself. As a result, Calhoun resorted to bulldoze the Renkins' garden at a last attempt to catch the gophers, resulting him accidentally capturing George by mistake. As a result, he was fired by Mr. Renkins, who decides to let the gophers stay.  Oddly enough, he looks similar to a gopher himself.
 Vicky (voiced by Rosslynn Taylor Jordan) and Vinny (voiced by Indigo) are African American siblings who live in the country near George and the Man with the Yellow Hat. They were introduced in 2007 in the episode Ski Monkey, where they help George get back home after a heavy snowfall. They are later seen in the episode Sprout Outing (2009) as Sprouts (a parody of a junior scouting organisation) with Bill and George. The siblings are friendly and playful.
 Cayley (voiced by Kari Wahlgren) owns a candy counter in Mabel's department store (a parody of Macy's, and likely a portmanteau name referencing both Macy's and its erstwhile competitor Gimbel's) in New York City.
 Carla (voiced by Amber Hood) is Bill's new neighbor.
 Dorothy (voiced by Grey DeLisle) is the Doorman's sister.
 Professor Alvin Einstein (voiced by Jim Cummings in Season 1 and Jeff Bennett in Season 8) is a rocket scientist who works with Professor Wiseman and Professor Anthony Pizza. He is not related to the famous scientist Albert Einstein. He often bickers with Professor Pizza.
 Dr. Baker (voiced by Kevin M. Richardson) is The Man with the Yellow Hat's doctor. He also goes to a hospital to help people who are sick and hurt. He uses bandage straps to help those who have a sprain or if someone put their hands in thorns.
 Dr. Ghesund (voiced by Dee Bradley Baker) is another doctor who works in the same office as Dr. Baker. In his debut episode, he was shown playing a video game, losing track of time to check on his recent patients. His name is similar to the German word for "bless you", "Gesundheit."
 Dr. Raj Desai (voiced by Jim Cummings) is a scientist that dug up all of the city Museum's dinosaur skeletons. He is very protective of his discoveries and only lets other scientists handle them. He is very forgetful though, and his wife often tells him he'd forget his head if it weren't attached. His newest donated project to the museum had the incorrect skull; the correct one was placed on the older skeleton next to it.
 The Grocer (voiced by Clyde Kusatsu) is the owner of the grocery store near George's apartment building in the city and has an adult son named Jon who helps him run the store.
 Gwen & Sisle are the respectively white & black women who work at the city animal pound.
 Jesse (voiced by Jeff Bennett) is credited as "Volunteer Storyteller" in Bill on Wheels. He leads story time to children who stays in hospitals. He then asked George if he could stay and hear a story, but George says "no". 
 Mr. Auger is a plumber always hired by the Man in the Yellow Hat to fix household plumbing problems. He always lets George watch him do his job. He is distressed at the fact that people never just call him over for a friendly visit.
 Mr. Dulson (voiced by Rob Paulsen): Appears in Roller Monkey and Fun Ball Tally.
 Mrs. Dulson (voiced by Debi Derryberry) is the eccentric owner of Dulsons Toy Store in the city. Her husband appears in "Roller Monkey", "Charlie's Escape" and "Fun Ball Tally".
 Mr. Reloj (voiced by Rob Paulsen) owns a clock store and knows everything about them. He walks very fast, but is forever late. His name is the Spanish word for clock.
 Mrs. D. (voiced by Candi Milo) is an owner of a donut store in the city and is sometimes called Ms. Donuts.
 Mr. Ruffweek (voiced by Rob Paulsen) is a blimp pilot who flies the Ruffweek Blimp. The blimp flies over 7 N. Avenue once in the morning, and again at sunset. His name is a play on the words "Rough Week", perhaps referring to his tight schedule or a play on the Goodyear Blimp.
 Professor Anthony "Tony" Pizza (voiced by Dee Bradley Baker in Season 1 and Frank Welker in Season 8) is one of the scientists who works with Professor Einstein and Professor Wiseman. He often bickers with Dr. Einstein.
 Rodney (voiced by Jim Cummings) is an employee of a market in the city (not the market George visits, it is on a nearby street, and serves as the store's main competitor), serving as the main antagonist in the episode "Bag Monkey".  In the episode he only appears in, he is shown witnessing the son of the Grocer trying to practice for the annual Bag-A-Lympics competition, wanting to challenge him on the day it starts. But the son of the Grocer sprains his hand while trying to put a canned ham on the bag. While arriving at the doctor's office to see him, he taunts him that he was looking forward to "beating him", as the sprain on the Grocer's son will recover in a week. As a result, the Grocer has George take his son's place by participating in the competition, having his son train him. During the Bag-A-Lympics, he competes against George and another unnamed grocer from another store. He is presumed to have won the first round, as George was distracted trying to think what food will fit in the bag. However, George wins the 2nd round by taking his time wisely, while the unnamed rival grocer is automatically eliminated due to an egg leak. This angered Rodney, who wanted to win the final round against George. Rodney later competes against George in the final round of the contest. During the final round, George uses his thinking skills to fit the canned ham properly in the bag, while Rodney has a slight lead over the former. Despite George's efforts, Rodney wins the competition. However, as he is about to be declared winner, the bag breaks due to his overconfidence of not fitting the food right, allowing George to win the contest. Rodney is last shown crying over his defeat.
 Officer Ken (voiced by Tim Dang) is a park ranger.
 Uncle Tam (voiced by Dee Bradley Baker) is The Man with the Yellow Hat's uncle, who dresses in green clothes with a white shirt and lives in a castle in Scotland with a golf course. In the episode Castle Keep, he was going to be evicted from his castle because he could no longer find the castle's deed, which meant he would have to pay 400 years of back taxes.
 The Zucchinis (voiced by James Arnold Taylor, Tara Strong and Grey DeLisle) are a family of three acrobats renowned for their balance. They are friends of Chef Pisghetti. The name Zucchinis it is a reference to the green color of their clothes and the italian "zucchine".
 Dog Trainer Man is a man that is involved with dog shows and competitions. Mainly seen in "Curious George Dog Counter" and "Charkie Goes to School". In his first appearance, he is first shown having each of his dogs win the show. When George decides to bring the dogs to the apartment so he can count how many dogs participated in the tournament, this upsets the trainer, pretending to panic upon finding out that the dogs left.

References

Characters
Lists of characters in American television animation
Lists of children's television characters